Marie-Thérèse Bruguière (born 26 October 1942) is a French politician, and retired hospital administrator.  She was elected to represent the department of Hérault in the Senate of France (le Sénat) on 21 September 2008.  She is a member of the Union for a Popular Movement (UMP), which is a part of the European People's Party (PPE).

Current positions 
 Mayor of Saint-Aunès since 1989
 Regional Councillor since 2004
 Senator from l'Hérault since 2008
 Vice president of the Communauté de communes du Pays de l'Or
 President of the SIVOM de l'étang de l'Or

External links 
 Her page on the Senate web site

1942 births
Living people
French Senators of the Fifth Republic
Union for a Popular Movement politicians
The Republicans (France) politicians
Women members of the Senate (France)
Women mayors of places in France
21st-century French women politicians
Senators of Hérault
Politicians from Occitania (administrative region)